Carex forrestii is a tussock-forming perennial in the family Cyperaceae. It is native to parts of Asia.

See also
 List of Carex species

References

forrestii
Plants described in 1913
Taxa named by Georg Kükenthal
Flora of China
Flora of Tibet